Miray Akay (born 17 July 2000) is a Ukrainian-Turkish actress.

Early life
Myroslava Kosteva Akay was born on 17 July 2000 in Ukraine to a Turkish father and a Ukrainian mother. She has an elder sister born in 1993, and a younger brother born in 2002. She had her primary and secondary education at Istanbul Bahçelievler Ali Haydar School. She graduated from theatre department of Mimar Sinan Fine Arts High School. She started acting at the age of three, working in various commercials and clips.

Career
At the age of three, Akay started her acting career. She played in the TV series Bitmeyen Şarkı. Simultaneously, she acted in the comedy seriesTürk malı. In 2012, she joined the cast of Çıplak Gerçek and portrayed the character Selin. In the same year, she acted in the historical film Eve Dönüş: Sarıkamış 1915 and played the character of Nihan. In 2013, she played the character of Duru Halaskar in the series 20 Dakika. Simultaneously, she worked in two films: she played the role of Deniz in the film Balık, and in Halam Geldi she portrayed the character of Reyhan. In 2013, she depicted the character of Mediha's sister in the period film Kelebeğin Rüyası. The next year she depicted the character of Gülten in the period series Benim Adım Gültepe. In 2015, she portrayed the character of Peri Yılmaz in the youth series Güneşin Kızları along with actresses Burcu Özberk and Hande Erçel. In 2017, she appeared as Nazlı in the series Dayan Yüregim. In 2018, she played the character of Zeynep in the series Bizim Hikaye, which was broadcast on FOX. Also in 2018, she appeared in the series Servet. Currently, she stars in the historical series Bir Zamanlar Kıbrıs in which she portrays the character of Pembe. The story is set in the year 1963.

Personal life
Miray Akay dated Atilla Doğukan, the couple got engaged on 17 June 2019, however the couple broke up later.

Filmography

References

External links
 
 

Living people
2000 births
Actresses from Istanbul
Turkish television actresses
21st-century Turkish actresses
Turkish film actresses
Turkish people of Ukrainian descent
Ukrainian people of Turkish descent